The 1930 Virginia Cavaliers football team was an American football team that represented the University of Virginia as a member of the Southern Conference during the 1930 college football season. In their second season under head coach Earl Abell, Virginia compiled an 4–6 record.

Schedule

References

Virginia
Virginia Cavaliers football seasons
Virginia Cavaliers football